Chasht Khvoreh (also Romanized as Chāsht Khvoreh, Chāsht Khowreh, Chāshtkhūreh, and Chāshtkhvoreh; also known as Chāshtkhoreh) is a village in Qolqol Rud Rural District, Qolqol Rud District, Tuyserkan County, Hamadan Province, Iran. At the 2006 census, its population was 737 people with 170 families.

References 

Populated places in Tuyserkan County